The 2010-11 Carleton Ravens represented Carleton University in Ottawa, Ontario, Canada during the 2010-11 CIS women's hockey season. The head coach is Shelley Coolidge.

Exhibition
On March 26, the Ravens participated in the Shoot for the Stars charitye hockey game to raise funds for the Children's Wish Foundation.

Roster

Postseason

Awards and honors
Olivia Sutter, Carleton Lady Ravens Rookie of the Year
Kristen Marson: 2011 Carleton University Most Outstanding Graduating Female Athlete

RSEQ Awards
Claudia Bergeron, 2011 RSEQ Second All-Star Team
Kristen Marson, 2011 RSEQ Second All-Star Team
Erica Skinner, RSEQ's candidate for the Marion Hilliard Award (The Marion Hilliard Award is presented annually to the CIS women's hockey player who best combines academic and sport excellence with community involvement.)

References

See also
 2011–12 Carleton Lady Ravens ice hockey season
 Carleton Lady Ravens ice hockey

External links 
 The official site of Carleton women’s hockey 

Carleton Ravens
Carleton
Carl